The Lamson PL-1 Quark was an American high-wing, single-seat, glider that was designed and constructed by Philip Lamson, first flying in early 1965.

Design and development
Lamson designed and built the Quark in 1964 as a lighthearted experimental aircraft project to create a prone position-pilot glider. To this end the pilot was accommodated lying down with his head in the nose bubble.

The PL-1 is constructed from fiberglass, with the wings made from a balsa-fiberglass sandwich that was laid up in a female mold. The airfoil was an Irv Culver modification to the NACA 0012. The landing gear was a monowheel, with small wing tip skids.

Soaring Magazine described the aircraft as "purely a lark and a quirky lark at that". The designer described the performance as "somewhere between a Nimbus and a Rogallo".

Only one Quark was built and it was registered with the US Federal Aviation Administration in the Experimental - amateur-built category.

Operational history
The aircraft logged about 300 hours in its  wingspan version. The Quark was removed from  the FAA registry on 13 August 2002 and the aircraft likely no longer exists.

Specifications (Quark)

See also

References

1960s United States sailplanes
Homebuilt aircraft
Prone pilot aircraft
Aircraft first flown in 1965